Shaka Loveless is the self-titled debut solo album of Danish artist Shaka Loveless recorded in Food Palace Studios and released on 1 September 2012 on Universal Music label.

Track listing

Personnel
Christian Møller – A&R(2)
Björn Engelmann – mastering
Morten Karlkvist – radio
Tomace – cover photography
Donkey Sound – producers
Shaka Loveless – vocals and instruments
Fresh-I, Pharfar – additional vocals and instruments

Musicians
Mads Krabbe – bass
Carl-Erik Riestra – bass
Lasse Boman – guitar
Tormod Holm – guitar
Zigge Kreutzmann – guitar
Anders Thykier – percussions
Lars Hartvig – saxophone
Jakob Johansen – trombone, trumpet
Helianne Blais – violin

Charts

References

2012 albums
Danish-language albums